Jalan Temenggong Ahmad or Jalan Parit Jawa (Johor state route J31) (Jawi: جالن تمڠݢوڠ احمد) is a major road in Johor, Malaysia. The road was built on the former site of the Muar State Railway (MSR) service until 1925. The road is very straight without any bends. There are many parit (canals) along this road.

List of junctions

Roads in Muar